Yukito is a masculine Japanese given name.

Possible writings
Yukito can be written using different combinations of kanji characters. Some examples: 

幸人, "happiness, person"
幸斗, "happiness, Big Dipper"
行人, "to go, person"
行斗, "to go, Big Dipper"
之人, "of, person"
之斗, "of, Big Dipper"
征人, "conquer, person"
志人, "determination, person"
志斗, "determination, Big Dipper"
恭人, "respectful, person"
五土, "5, earth"
雪人, "snow, person"
雪斗, "snow, Big Dipper"
雪兎, "snow, rabbit"
由紀人, "reason, chronicle, person"

The name can also be written in hiragana ゆきと or katakana ユキト.

Notable people with the name

, Japanese musician and singer
, pen name of Naoyuki Uchida, Japanese writer
, Japanese manga artist
, Japanese triple jumper
Yukito Tokumoto (徳元 幸人, born 1976), Japanese volleyball player

Characters
 Yukito Tsukishiro  (月城 雪兎), a character in the anime and manga series Card Captor Sakura
 Yukito Orisaka  (折笠 千斗), a character in the game, anime and manga franchises Idolish7 

Japanese masculine given names